White Earth Tribal and Community College (WETCC) is a private tribal land-grant community college in Mahnomen, Minnesota. It was established by the White Earth Reservation Tribal Council in 1997.

Academics
WETCC is accredited by the Higher Learning Commission (HLC) and provides an Associate of Arts degree program.

Partnerships
The college is a member of the American Indian Higher Education Consortium, which is a community of tribally and federally chartered institutions working to strengthen tribal nations and make a lasting difference in the lives of American Indians and Alaska Natives. WETCC was created in response to the higher education needs of American Indians. WETCC generally serves geographically isolated populations that have no other means of accessing education beyond the high school level.

See also
American Indian College Fund (AICF)

References

External links 
 

Two-year colleges in the United States
Educational institutions established in 1997
Education in Mahnomen County, Minnesota
American Indian Higher Education Consortium
Community colleges in Minnesota
1997 establishments in Minnesota